The Whirlwind of Youth is a 1927 American silent romance film directed by Rowland V. Lee and starring Lois Moran, Vera Voronina, Donald Keith and Alyce Mills.

Cast
 Lois Moran as Nancy Hawthorne 
 Vera Voronina as Heloise 
 Donald Keith as Bob Whittaker 
 Alyce Mills as Cornelia Evans 
 Larry Kent as Lloyd Evans 
 Gareth Hughes as Curley 
 Charles Lane as Jim Hawthorne

References

Bibliography
 Gillian B. Anderson. Music for silent films, 1894-1929: a guide. Library of Congress, 1988.

External links

1927 films
1920s romance films
American romance films
Films directed by Rowland V. Lee
American silent feature films
Paramount Pictures films
American black-and-white films
1920s English-language films
1920s American films